Milán Václavík (28 March 1928 – 2 January 2007) was a Slovak-origin Czechoslovak military officer with the rank of colonel general. He served as defence minister from 1985 to 1989, being the last communist-era defence minister of Czechoslovakia.

Early life
Václavík was born in Predmier, Zilina district in Slovakia, on 28 March 1928. He held an engineering degree. In the 1950s he was sent to the Soviet Union for military training and attended the Frunze Military Academy and the General Staff Academy.

Career
Václavík worked as an engineer until 1949 when he joined the Czechoslovak People's Army. In the 1970s he served as deputy commander of the western military district. He was later promoted to the rank of colonel general. He served as first deputy chief of the army General Staff from 1983 to 11 January 1985.

He was appointed defence minister on 11 January 1985, replacing Martin Dzúr in the post. Václavík served in the cabinet led by Prime Minister Lubomír Štrougal under the President Gustáv Husák. Václavík became a member of the central committee of the Communist Party of Czechoslovakia soon after his appointment. He retained his post in the cabinet formed by Prime Minister Ladislav Adamec in October 1988.

On 29 November 1989 Václavík was asked by the Federal Assembly to answer the question to whom the Czechoslovak People's Army was subordinated. In response Václavík stated that it was subordinated to those who supported socialism, leading to concerns among the Czech parliamentarians. Upon this incident and due to the pressures on the Prime Minister Adamec to relieve him from the post he was removed from office. Then Miroslav Vacek became the new defense minister on 3 December 1989.

Later years and death
Following his removal from office Václavík lost all his credibility due to his support for the continuation of the communist regime in the country. He was prosecuted in January 1996 together with other former major Communist Party figures. All of them were charged with the illegal arming of the militia. In September 1996 Václavík was pardoned by the president Václav Havel because of poor health. Václavík died in 2007.

References

External links

20th-century engineers
1928 births
2007 deaths
Communist Party of Slovakia (1939) politicians
Czechoslovak generals
Czechoslovak expatriates in the Soviet Union
Czechoslovak prisoners and detainees
Defence Ministers of Czechoslovakia
Frunze Military Academy alumni
Members of the Chamber of the People of Czechoslovakia (1981–1986)
Members of the Chamber of the People of Czechoslovakia (1986–1990)
Members of the Central Committee of the Communist Party of Czechoslovakia
Military Academy of the General Staff of the Armed Forces of the Soviet Union alumni
Military personnel of the Cold War
People from Bytča District
Recipients of the Order of Lenin
Slovak engineers